Marcellus may refer to:

 Marcellus (name)
 Marcus Claudius Marcellus, Roman commander

Places
 Marcellus, Lot-et-Garonne, France
 Marcellus Township, Michigan
 Marcellus, Michigan, a village in Marcellus Township
 Marcellus Community Schools
 Marcellus High School (Michigan)
 Marcellus News, a newspaper
 Marcellus, New York
 Marcellus Central School District
 Marcellus High School
 Marcellus (village), New York

Other uses
 Marcellus (1811 ship)
 Marcellus Formation, a mapped bedrock unit in eastern North America
 Protographium marcellus, a butterfly
 Pseudorhabdosynochus marcellus, a fish parasite
 , a collier in service with the United States Navy from 1898 to 1910

See also
 
 Marsalis (disambiguation), a family of American musicians
 Marcello
 Marcelo
 Marcel (disambiguation)